Osero may refer to:
 Othello (owarai), a Japanese play
 Osor, Croatia, a town in Croatia